Antler Creek is a creek located in the Cariboo region of British Columbia.  The creek was discovered in 1860 by John Rose.  The creek was mined and at one time produced $10,000 per day.  The Sawmill flat area was considered the richest section.  The creek has been drifted, hydraulicked, sluiced and hand mined.

References

External links
 

Rivers of British Columbia